The Best of No Angels is a compilation album by German girl group No Angels. It was released by Polydor–Zeitgeist and Cheyenne Records on 1 December 2003 in German-speaking Europe, coinciding with the group's first disbandment. A best-of album, it features all the singles from their first three studio albums Elle'ments (2001), Now... Us! (2002) and Pure (2003), as well as three additional album cuts from each album, including production from Thorsten Brötzmann, Leslie Mándoki, Mousse T., Perky Park, Peter Plate, Peter Ries, Ulf Leo Sommer, and Twin.

Following its release, Best of No Angels received positive reviews from music critics who praised the included material as the highlights of the group's music career. The compilation debuted and peaked at number five on the German Albums Chart and reached the top twenty in Austria. In addition to already existing material, the band recorded a slightly reworked version of their debut album closing track "That's the Reason" for the album. Re-titled "Reason", the ballad was released as the album's only single, also reaching the top ten in Germany

Critical reception

Stefan Johannesberg from laut.de found that The Best of No Angels "portrays the three-year rise from the RTL 2 gutter to a real divas combo with an experienced selection of songs [...] No matter how you feel about music, this advancement of No Angels deserves respect. As well as the decision to quit."

Chart performance
Released on 1 December 2003, The Best of No Angels debuted and peaked at number five on the German Albums Chart in the week ending 15 December 2003. This marked the band's fifth consecutive top ten album on the chart. Elsewhere, it entered the top twenty in Austria, peaking at number 17, and the top sity in Switzerland. In Germany, The Best of No Angels was ranked eighty-seventh on the 2003 year-end chart.

Track listing

Charts

Weekly charts

Year-end charts

References 

No Angels albums
2003 greatest hits albums
Polydor Records compilation albums